Hassall is a surname. Notable people with the surname include:

Arthur Hill Hassall (1817–1894), British physician, chemist and microscopist
Cedric Hassall, New Zealand chemist
Charlie Hassall (1863–?), English footballer
Christopher Hassall (1912–1963), English actor, dramatist, librettist, lyricist and poet
Eliza Marsden Hassall (1834–1917), Australian philanthropist
Harold Hassall (1929–2015), English footballer
Ian Hassall, New Zealand paediatrician
Imogen Hassall (1942–1980), English actress
Joan Hassall (1906–1988), English wood engraver and illustrator
Joe Hassall (1871–1895), English footballer
John Hassall (disambiguation), multiple people
Jon Hassall (born 1973), Australian rules footballer
Nanette Hassall (born 1947), Australian dancer and choreographer
Thomas Hassall (1840–1920), Australian politician